Substantive law is the set of laws that governs how members of a society are to behave. It is contrasted with procedural law, which is the set of procedures for making, administering, and enforcing substantive law. Substantive law defines rights and responsibilities in civil law, and crimes and punishments in criminal law. It may be codified in statutes or exist through precedent in common law.

Henry Sumner Maine said of early law, "So great is the ascendency of the Law of Actions in the infancy of Courts of Justice, that substantive law has at first the look of being gradually secreted in the interstices of procedure; and the early lawyer can only see the law through the envelope of its technical forms."

See also
 Substantive rights

References

Sources
Glanville Williams. "Substantive and Adjectival Law". Learning the Law. Eleventh Edition. Stevens and Sons. London. 1982. Pages 19 to 23.
John W Salmond. "Substantive Law and the Law of Procedure". The First Principles of Jurisprudence. Stevens & Haynes. Bell Yard, Temple Bar, London. 1893. Pages 215 to 218.
Walter Denton Smith. A Manual of Elementary Law. West Publishing Co. St Paul, Minn. 1894. Pages 110 to 116. Part 2 (The Substantive Law). Pages 123 to 279.
"Substantive and Adjective Law" (1881) 16 The Law Journal 441 (1 October 1881)
J Newton Fiero, "The Relation of Procedure to the Substantive Law", Law Pamph. Vol 202. (1904) 2 Delta Chi Quarterly 5 (January 1904).
Clark , "The Handmaid of Justice" (1938) 23 Washington University Law Quarterly 297. Reprint, 1965.
Abraham Lawrence Sainer. The Substantive Law of New York. Substantive & Adjective Law Publishers. Eighteenth Edition. 1967.
Whitely Stokes (ed). The Anglo-Indian Codes. Clarendon Press, Oxford. 1887. Volume 1 (Substantive Law).

Common law legal terminology
American legal terminology